Mother (translit. Mat, also known as Zapreshchyonnye lyudi) is a 1990 Soviet drama film based on Maxim Gorky's novels The Mother (1906) and The Life of a Useless Man (1908) and short story "Karamora" (1923), directed by Gleb Panfilov and co-produced with Italy. It was entered into the 1990 Cannes Film Festival.

Cast
 Inna Churikova
 Viktor Rakov
 Liubomiras Lauciavicius
 Alexey Buldakov
 Aleksandr Shishonok  
 Dmitry Pevtsov
 Aleksandr Karin
 Ivan Kabardin  
 Vladimir Prozorov
 Vladimir Fateyev 
 Olga Shukshina
 Antonella Interlenghi
 Andrei Rostotsky
 Vyacheslav Bogachyov
 Innokenty Smoktunovsky
 Andrey Myagkov
 Mario Adorf

References

External links

1990 films
1990 drama films
Soviet drama films
Italian drama films
1990s Russian-language films
Films based on works by Maxim Gorky
Films based on Russian novels
Films directed by Gleb Panfilov
Films shot in Nizhny Novgorod
Films set in Russia
Mosfilm  films